Goat Island is an island on the Mohawk River north of Niskayuna in Saratoga County, New York.

References

Islands of New York (state)
Mohawk River
River islands of New York (state)